Callum Iestyn Carson (born 13 March 1999) is a Welsh rugby union player, currently playing for Welsh Premier Division side Aberavon. His preferred position is centre.

On 10 June 2022, Carson was announced by Aberavon to be the newest addition to their squad.

Ospreys
Carson has represented Wales at both U20 level and more recently in Sevens, participating in two tournaments of the 2019–20 World Rugby Sevens Series. He was named in the Ospreys side for Round 4 of the 2020–21 Pro14 against Zebre.

On 1 July 2022, Carson was officially released by the Ospreys for the involvement in an incident revolving around the mocking of a rough sleeper.

Wales sevens 
Carson competed for Wales at the 2022 Rugby World Cup Sevens in Cape Town.

References

External links
 
 

1999 births
Living people
Welsh rugby union players
Ospreys (rugby union) players
Rugby union centres
Rugby sevens players at the 2022 Commonwealth Games